The Dramatic Ramesseum Papyrus (also known simply as the Ramesseum Papyrus) is the oldest known surviving illustrated papyrus roll. It contains a ceremonial play celebrating the coronation or the Sed festival performed for Senusret I of the Twelfth Dynasty. It is dated to around 1980 BC. It was discovered in the Ramesseum, from which it gets its name. The text of the roll is in linear hieroglyphs written in narrow, vertical columns. The text occupies the top four-fifths of the scroll and the illustrations the bottom. The scenes are arranged in a manner similar to a modern comic strip with the Pharaoh, in the role of Horus, appearing multiple times. Scenes are divided from each other by vertical lines. The papyrus is now preserved at the British Museum.

References

Weitzmann, Kurt. Illustrations in Roll and Codex. Princeton University Press, 1970.
20th century BC in Egypt
20th-century BC literature
Egyptian papyri
Illuminated manuscripts
Egyptian plays
Twelfth Dynasty of Egypt
Ancient Egyptian objects in the British Museum